Anandha Jodhi is a 1963 Indian Tamil-language drama film, directed by V. N. Reddy and A. S. A. Sami. The film stars M. G. Ramachandran and Devika. The film, produced by P. S. Veerappa and written by Javar Seetharaman, was released on 5 July 1963.

Plot 

Anand, a physical education teacher in a school, is accused of a murder, while he is totally innocent. In his escape, for his innocence, he can count only on his beloved Jodhi and her younger brother, playful Balu, Anand's schoolchild.

Cast 
 M. G. Ramachandran as Anandhan
 Devika as Jodhi
 M. R. Radha as Punyakodi
 S. A. Ashokan as Inspector Baskar
 S. V. Sahasranamam as Muthaiah Pillai
 S. V. Ramadas as Abhu Salim
 Javar Seetharaman as CID Sundar
 Kamal Haasan as Balu
 P. S. Veerappa as Jambu
 Manorama as Mano
 Karikol Raju as Anandhan's father

Production 
Ananda Jodhi was jointly directed by V. N. Reddy and A. S. A. Sami and was produced by actor P. S. Veerappa under the company Hariharan Films. The film's story and dialogues were written by Javar Seetharaman. Cinematography was handled by J. G. Vijayam, and editing by C. P. Jambulingam. This was the only where Devika and M. G. Ramachandran acted together.

Soundtrack 
The music was composed by Viswanathan–Ramamoorthy, with lyrics by Kannadasan. The song "Kaalamagal" is set in Shubhapantuvarali raga.

Release and reception 
Ananda Jothi was released on 5 July 1963, and distributed by Emgeeyar Pictures in Madras. Writing for Sport and Pastime, T. M. Ramachandran gave a positive review praising Ramachandran's performance as "convincing" and other actors and also praised Viswanathan–Ramamoorthy's music. Kanthan of Kalki also gave a positive review for various aspects, including the cinematography, cast performances (especially that of Haasan) and Seetharaman's writing. The film was dubbed Telugu-language as Donga Bangaram and released on 30 October 1964.

References

External links 
 

1960s Tamil-language films
1963 drama films
1963 films
Films scored by Viswanathan–Ramamoorthy
Films with screenplays by Javar Seetharaman
Indian black-and-white films
Indian drama films